Acokanthera rotundata (commonly known as round-leaved poison-bush) is a plant in the family Apocynaceae. It grows as a shrub or small tree, with fragrant flowers featuring a white corolla, often pink to red on the corolla tube. The fruit is red to purple when ripe. Its habitat is in rocky areas of dry woodland. Acokanthera rotundata is native to Zimbabwe, Eswatini and South Africa.

References

rotundata
Flora of Zimbabwe
Flora of Swaziland
Flora of South Africa
Plants described in 1961